Endsieg is German for "ultimate victory". It is generally used to denote a victory at the end of a war or conflict. Adolf Hitler used Endsieg in his book Mein Kampf ("My Struggle") in 1925 where he ironically asks if fate wanted the Jewish people to achieve "final victory".

In the 1930s and 1940s, the word was widely used in the propaganda and doctrine of Nazi Germany, meaning that despite temporary losses, the Third Reich would ultimately prevail, and any breakdown in allegiance to Nazi ideology was not to be tolerated. This conjuration of final victory became more desperate in 1943 when Allied successes forced Germany onto the defensive. Joseph Goebbels still spoke about Endsieg as late as March 1945.

References

German words and phrases
Nazi terminology